The 5th/7th Battalion, Royal New Zealand Infantry Regiment is an Army Reserve infantry battalion of the Royal New Zealand Infantry Regiment with its headquarters in Trentham, New Zealand.

History 
The 7th Battalion, RNZIR was formed in 1964 during the reorganisation of the army by the amalgamation of two separate regiments:
Wellington Regiment (City of Wellington's Own)
Hawke's Bay Regiment (which had earlier incorporated the Ruahine Regiment)

In 1948 the Wellington West Coast Regiment amalgamated with the Taranaki Regiment to form The Wellington West Coast & Taranaki Regiment.

In 1964 The Wellington West Coast & Taranaki Regiment became the 5th Battalion, RNZIR.

In 1974 further name changes occurred to reflect each units historical links -
5th (Wellington West Coast & Taranaki) Battalion, RNZIR.
7th (Wellington (City of Wellington's Own) and Hawke's Bay) Battalion, RNZIR.

The respective amalgamations saw the new regiments become Territorial Force battalions of the Royal New Zealand Infantry Regiment. This lasted until another reorganisation in 1999, which saw the TF battalions split from the RNZIR to become multi-function battalion groups.

Then again in 2012 the territorial force reorganised with the battalion groups splitting and the former units rejoining their parent corps and regiments. The infantry battalions were amalgamated from six to three, this included the 5th and 7th Battalions which amalgamated to form the 5th/7th Battalion, Royal New Zealand Infantry Regiment.

Regimental bands 
Until 30 June 2012, both battalions each had a regimental band or regimental pipes and drums. But funding to the territorial force bands was cut in favour of keeping the full-time New Zealand Army Band. Both the former Regimental Pipes and Drums of the 5th (Wellington West Coast and Taranaki) Battalion, RNZIR and the Regimental Band of the 7th (Wellington (City of Wellington's Own) and Hawke's Bay) Battalion, RNZIR continue as incorporated societies while retaining their respective uniforms, rank, instruments and band rooms. Notably, the 7th Battalion Band performed at Government House, Wellington for the territorial force amalgamation parade in March 2013.

Battle honours 
5th (Wellington West Coast & Taranaki) Battalion
New Zealand
South Africa
First World War: Somme 1916–18, Messines 1917, Ypres 1917, Bapaume 1918, Hindenburg Line, Landing at ANZAC, France and Flanders 1916–1918, Sari Bair 1915, Gallipoli 1915, Egypt 1915–1916
Second World War: Greece 1941, Crete, Sidi Rezegh 1941, Minquar Qaim, El Alamein, North Africa 1940–1943, Cassino I, The Senio, Italy 1943–45, Solomons

The 5th (Wellington West Coast & Taranaki) Battalion is one of two unique units of the Commonwealth, in that it is one of two units to have its own country's name as a battle honour. This dates from the service of the Taranaki Volunteer Rifle Corps, from which the Taranaki Regiment is descended, during the New Zealand Wars, specifically in the Battle of Waireka.

The other unit to share this honour is the Cape Town Highlanders Regiment a reserve mechanised unit of South African Army.

7th (Wellington (City of Wellington's Own) and Hawke's Bay) Battalion
South Africa 1900–02
First World War: Somme 1916–18, Messines 1917, Ypres 1917, Bapaume 1918, Hindenburg Line, Sambre (Le Quesnoy), Landing at ANZAC, France and Flanders 1916–18, Sari Bair, Gallipoli 1915
Second World War: Greece 1941, Crete, Tobruk 1941, Minquar Qaim, El Alamein, Tebaga Gap, The Sangro, Cassino I, The Senio, Solomons 1942–44

Alliances 
 – Princess of Wales's Royal Regiment (Queen's and Royal Hampshires)
 – The Highlanders
 – The Duke of Lancaster's Regiment (King's Lancashire and Border)
 – The Lincoln and Welland Regiment

References

External links 
 7th Battalion Band

Infantry units and formations of New Zealand
Military units and formations established in 2012